Samuel Prout (17 September 1783 – 10 February 1852) was a British watercolourist, and one of the masters of watercolour architectural painting. Prout secured the position of Painter in Water-Colours in Ordinary to King George IV in 1829 and afterwards to Queen Victoria. John Ruskin, whose work often emulated Prout's, wrote in 1844, "Sometimes I tire of Turner, but never of Prout". Prout is often compared to his contemporaries: Turner, Constable and Ruskin, whom he taught. He was the uncle of the artist John Skinner Prout.

Biography
Samuel Prout was born at Plymouth, the fourth of fourteen children born to Samuel Prout Senior, a naval outfitter in the dockyard city, and Mary Cater. Attending Plymouth Grammar School he came under the influence of Headmaster Dr. John Bidlake who encouraged the young Prout and Benjamin Robert Haydon in their artistic apprenticeship. They spent whole summer days drawing the quiet cottages, rustic bridges and romantic watermills of the beautiful valleys of Devon. With John Britton, he made a journey through Cornwall to try his hand in furnishing sketches for Britton's Beauties of England. In 1803, he moved to London, where he stayed until 1812. Marrying Elizabeth Gillespie in 1810, they had four children; Rebecca Elizabeth (b. 1813), Elizabeth Delsey (b. 1817), Isabella Anne (b. 1820), and Samuel Gllespie (b. 1822).

In London, Prout saw new possibilities, and endeavoured to correct and improve his style by studying the works of the rising school of landscape. To earn a living, he painted marine pieces for Palser the printseller, took students, and published drawing books for learners. He was one of the first to use lithography.

It was not however until about 1818 that Prout discovered his niche. Happening time to make his first visit to the Continent, and to study the quaint streets and market-places of continental cities, he suddenly found himself in a new and enchanting province of art. His eye caught the picturesque features of the architecture, and his hand recorded them with skill. The composition of his drawings was exquisitely natural; their colour exhibited "the truest and happiest association in sun and shade"; the picturesque remnants of ancient architecture were rendered with the happiest breadth and largeness, with the heartiest perception and enjoyment of their time-worn ruggedness; and the solemnity of great cathedrals was brought out with striking effect.

He established his reputation with these street scenes, and gained praise from his erstwhile student John Ruskin. Until Prout, says Ruskin, excessive and clumsy artificiality characterized the picturesque: what ruins early artists drew "looked as if broken down on purpose; what weeds they put on seemed put on for ornament". To Prout, therefore, goes credit for the creation of the essential characteristics lacking in earlier art, in particular "that feeling which results from the influence, among the noble lines of architecture, of the rent and the rust, the fissure, the lichen, and the weed, and from the writings upon the pages of ancient walls of the confused hieroglyphics of human history". Prout, in other words, does not unfeelingly depict signs of age and decay chiefly for the sake of interesting textures, but rather employs these textures and other characteristics of the picturesque to create deeply felt impressions of age nobly endured. Though they are often compared, neither Turner nor Prout were vulgar artists, and while Turner concentrated upon the infinite beauties of nature, Prout was more interested by the cityscape.

Prout was appointed the coveted title of 'Painter in Water-Colours in Ordinary' to King George IV in 1829, and afterwards to Queen Victoria.

At the time of his death there was hardly a place in France, Germany, Italy (especially Venice) or the Netherlands where his face had not been seen searching for antique gables and sculptured pieces of stone. He died after a stroke at his home, 5 De Crespigny Terrace, Denmark Hill, London and was buried at West Norwood Cemetery.

A large quantity of his original sketchbooks, lithographs, account books, letters and family materials are held at the North Devon Athenaeum, Barnstaple, Devon. The collection was sold at auction in 2010, and much was acquired by Plymouth City Museum & Art Gallery, adding to its existing holdings of his work.

Samuel Gillespie Prout followed in his father's footsteps by also painting watercolours. his nephew was the composer Ebenezer Prout. Another member of the family, John Skinner Prout made a career for himself painting and writing books in Tasmania.

References

Further reading
By Samuel Prout

 Picturesque Delineations in the Counties of Devon and Cornwall T. Palser, London 1812.
 Prout's Village Scenery T. Palser, London 1813.
Rudiments of Landscape in Progressive Studies (R. Ackermann London, 1813)
 Picturesque Studies of Cottages R. Ackermann 1816
 Sketches of the Thames Estuary T Palser London 1817
 Marine Sketches Rowney & Forster, London 1820.
 Picturesque Buildings in Normandy Rodwell and Martin, London 1821.
 Views in the North of England R. Ackermann 1821.
 Studies from Nature Rodwell & Martin London 1823
 Illustrations of the Rhine J. Dickinson 1824.
 Views in Germany J. Dickinson 1826.
 Interior and Exteriors Ackermann & Co 1834
 Hints on Light and ShadowAckermann & Co 1838
 Prout's Microcosm Tilt & Bogue, London 1841.

About Samuel Prout

Ruskin, John. A memoir of Prout (in Art Journal 1849)
Prout compared to Turner in Tate exhibition.  Tate Exhibition Turner/Prout
Sabine Baring-Gould on Samuel Prout, s:Devonshire Characters and Strange Events/Samuel Prout
Ruskin, John. Notes on the Fine Art Society's Loan Collection of Drawings by Samuel Prout and William Hunt (The Fine Art Society, 1880) .

Various. 
Lockett, Richard. Samuel Prout (1783–1852) (Batsford Ltd, 1985). 
Graham, Paul. West Norwood Cemetery: The Dickens Connection (Friends of West Norwood Cemetery, 1995).

External links

 Samuel Prout at the Tate Gallery, London
 Samuel Prout at The Louvre, Paris
 Sketches by Samuel Prout: in France, Belgium, Germany, Italy and Switzerland, 1915
 Gainsborough to Ruskin Exhibition at the Morgan, New York
 Samuel Prout at the Manchester Art Gallery, UK
 Samuel Prout at the National Gallery of Art, Washington DC
 Samuel Prout in Tate exhibition "Ruskin, Turner and the Pre-Raphaelites"
Samuel Prout at Open Library
 Paintings engraved for Fisher's Drawing Room Scrap Books with poetical illustrations by Letitia Elizabeth Landon:
1832, engraved by William John Cook, 
1832, engraved by Robert Wallis , 
1833, engraved by R Sands, 
1833, engraved by William Joseph Taylor, 
1833, engraved by E Challis, 
1833, engraved by R Sands, 
1833, engraved by William Woolnoth, 
1837, engraved by William Miller, 
1837, engraved by Edward Francis Finden, 
1837, engraved by James Carter, 
1838, engraved by Ebenezer Challis, 
1838, engraved by Robert Wallis, 
1838, engraved by James Baylis Allen, 
 In Fisher's Drawing Room Scrap Book, 1834, as illustrations to Letitia Elizabeth Landon's poem :
 Ruins, Old Delhi, engraved by S Lacey.
 Excavated Temple of Kylas, Ellora, engraved by E Challis.  
 Bejapore, engraved by T Jeavons.
 Taj Bowlee, Bejapore, engraved by J Redaway.
 Tomb of Shere Shah, engraved by W A LePetit.
 In Fisher's Drawing Room Scrap Book, 1834, as illustrations to Letitia Elizabeth Landon's poem :
 Triad Figure, Interior of Elephanta engraved by William Woolnoth.
 Cawnpore engraved by C Mottram.

1783 births
1852 deaths
19th-century English painters
English male painters
Artists from Plymouth, Devon
Burials at West Norwood Cemetery
English watercolourists
19th-century English male artists